Heidler is a German surname. Notable people with the surname include:

Betty Heidler (born 1983), German hammer thrower
Gert Heidler (born 1948), East German footballer and manager

See also
Heider (surname)

German-language surnames